Johnrey Rivas (born March 30, 1997), is a Filipino actor, singer and director.

Career

Acting and career beginnings 

A 12-year-old Rivas approached director Vince Tañada, after a staging of Ako si Ninoy in Tondo High School, to audition as an actor. During his initial audition with Philippine Stagers Foundation, Rivas failed to clinch a top 10 spot among 700 aspirants. He initially worked as an usher for the group to expose himself to the theater industry and officially debuted as an actor when he was 16.

Rivas was awarded Best Supporting Actor in 70th FAMAS Awards for his role in the period drama film Katips, which was based on the 2016 musical of the same name where he also previously appeared.

As director 

In 2021, the short film Zomnia, directed by Rivas, was nominated in the 2021 FAMAS Awards.

Filmography

Television

Film

Theater

Awards and nominations

References

External links
 

1997 births
Living people
Place of birth missing (living people)
Filipino male film actors
Filipino male stage actors